Delaware Route 279 (DE 279) is a  long state highway located in northern New Castle County, Delaware.  It is signed north-south and runs from the Maryland state line southwest of Newark, where it continues as Maryland Route 279 (MD 279), northeast to DE 4 and DE 896 in Newark. DE 279 follows a four-lane divided highway called Elkton Road and serves as part of the route connecting Elkton, Maryland with Newark. The roadway is maintained by the Delaware Department of Transportation (DelDOT). DE 279 was originally the westernmost portion of DE 2, designated in the 1930s. This portion of road was widened into a divided highway in 1972. In 2013, DE 2 was truncated from the Maryland state line to east of Newark to simplify the route designations through Newark, resulting in DE 279 being designated to its current alignment.

Route description

DE 279 begins at the Maryland state line southwest of the city of Newark. The road continues southwest into that state as MD 279, which heads toward the town of Elkton. From the state line, the route heads northeast on Elkton Road, a four-lane divided highway. DE 279 heads through commercial areas of Newark, where it passes north of the Newark Charter School and crosses the West Branch Christina River before it comes to an intersection with Otts Chapel Road. The road continues past more commercial development and reaches an intersection with the western terminus of DE 4 and DE 896 (Christiana Parkway). Here, DE 279 ends and Elkton Road continues northeast as part of DE 896 toward downtown Newark. The entire length of the route is located in New Castle County.

DE 279 has an annual average daily traffic count of 30,155 vehicles west of Otts Chapel Road and 14,214 vehicles east of Otts Chapel Road. The entire length of DE 279 is part of the National Highway System.

History

What is now DE 279 was originally an unimproved county road. From the 1910s to the 1938, it was part of a branch of the Lincoln Highway, and part of the Capitol Trail, which ran from Atlanta through Washington, D.C., passing through Delaware by way of Newark, Wilmington, and Claymont, before terminating in Philadelphia. By 1924, the road was paved. In 1925, suggestions were made for the state to take over maintenance of the highway connecting the Maryland state line to Newark.  In 1927, the state took over maintenance of the highway between the Maryland state line and Newark. When Delaware designated its state highways by 1936, the current alignment of DE 279 was designated as the westernmost part of DE 2, which ran from the Maryland state line through Newark and continued east to Wilmington. The portion of DE 2 along Elkton Road between the Maryland state line and Newark was widened into a divided highway in 1972. In 2013, DelDOT proposed the renumbering of routes in and around Newark, which involved truncating DE 2 from the Maryland state line to the eastern edge of Newark and the removal of DE 2 Bus. through downtown Newark. As a result of these changes, the portion of Elkton Road between the Maryland state line and DE 4/DE 896 (Christiana Parkway) was to be designated as DE 279, matching the route number across the Maryland state line. The goal of the project was to "simplify the route designations in Newark, reduce sign clutter, and reduce sign maintenance costs." The changes were completed in the middle part of 2013.

Major intersections

See also

References

External links

 DE 279 at AARoads.com

279
Transportation in New Castle County, Delaware
Newark, Delaware